The 1977 National Challenge Cup was the 64th edition of the USSF's annual open soccer championship. Teams from the North American Soccer League declined to participate.  Maccabee Los Angeles of Los Angeles defeated the Philadelphia United German-Hungarians of Philadelphia in the final game.

References

External links
 1977 U.S. Open Cup – TheCup.us

Lamar Hunt U.S. Open Cup
U.S. Open Cup